Godtfred Hegelund Olsen (22 July 1883 – 21 June 1954) was a Danish road racing cyclist who competed in the 1912 Summer Olympics. He was born in Roholte, Fakse municipality and died in Frederiksberg.

In 1912 he was a member of the Danish cycling team which finished eighth in the team time trial event. In the individual time trial competition he finished 53rd.

References

1883 births
1954 deaths
Danish male cyclists
Olympic cyclists of Denmark
Cyclists at the 1912 Summer Olympics
People from Faxe Municipality
Sportspeople from Region Zealand